The Pod Generation is a 2023 science fiction romantic comedy film written and directed by Sophie Barthes.

The film was released at the 2023 Sundance Film Festival on 19 January 2023.

Premise
A couple in futuristic New York use technology such as detachable artificial wombs and pods to start their family.

Cast
 Emilia Clarke as Rachel
 Chiwetel Ejiofor as Alvy
 Rosalie Craig as Linda Wozcheck
 Vinette Robinson as Alice
 Kathryn Hunter as The Philosopher
 Jean-Marc Barr as The Founder
 Rita Bernard-Shaw
 Megan Maczko

Production
It was announced in October 2021 that Emilia Clarke and Chiwetel Ejiofor would star in the film, which is going to be written and directed by Sophie Barthes. In May 2022, Rosalie Craig, Vinette Robinson and Kathryn Hunter were added to the cast. Rita Bernard-Shaw and Megan Maczko were reported as part of the cast in November 2022.

Filming took place in March 2022 in Belgium.

Release
The Pod Generation premiered at the 2023 Sundance Film Festival on 19 January 2023.

Reception 
On review aggregator website Rotten Tomatoes, the film has an approval rating of 40% based on 43 reviews, with an average rating of 5.7/10. On Metacritic, it has a weighted average score of 63 out of 100 based on 16 critics, indicating "mixed or average reviews".

References

External links

2023 films
2023 independent films
Films shot in Belgium
Belgian science fiction films
French science fiction films